Elena Alekseevna Porosniuc (also spelled Porozhnyuk or Porojniuc; born 22 October 1987) is a retired Moldovan football defender, last played for Kubanochka Krasnodar in the Russian Championship. She previously played for Nadezhda Noginsk and Energiya Voronezh and she was a member of the currently inactive Moldovan national team.

At the end of 2017 season she retired from playing and became a coach in Kubanochka club system.

See also
List of Moldova women's international footballers

References

External links
 
 

1987 births
Living people
Women's association football defenders
Moldovan women's footballers
Footballers from Chișinău
Moldova women's international footballers
Russian Women's Football Championship players
Nadezhda Noginsk players
FC Energy Voronezh players
Kubanochka Krasnodar players
Moldovan expatriate footballers
Moldovan expatriate sportspeople in Russia
Expatriate women's footballers in Russia